Damariscotta "Scottie" Helm is the World Whistling Grand Champion of 2011 at the
International Whistlers Convention in Louisburg, North Carolina. 2011 was her second year competing where she placed 1st in both the Popular and Classical categories and Allied Arts.

Damariscotta is the only known whistler in the world who performs the 'double whistle' where she is able to whistle two different notes simultaneously.

Damariscotta was born and currently lives in Rocky Mount, North Carolina where she attends North Carolina Wesleyan College.

References 

 International Whistlers Convention Website
 IWC 2011 List of Winners

External links 
 International Whistlers Convention
 IWC 2011 Winners
 Rocky Mount Telegram Article
 WHDH-TV Boston Video Clip
 North Carolina Wesleyan College Article

Whistlers
Musicians from North Carolina
Living people
People from Rocky Mount, North Carolina
North Carolina Wesleyan College alumni
Year of birth missing (living people)